Alireza Talischi (born September 29, 1985, in Tehran) is an Iranian singer, songwriter and Music Producer. He is originally from Hamadan.

Career 
Alireza Talischi started singing professionally when he was 18 years old. In February 2005, he and one of his friends named Hamidreza started his official activity as a two-person group called "Alireza and Hamidreza". At that time, they released songs that were well received by the people at that time. Together, the two released two albums called "Narefigh 1" and "Narefigh 2". After a while, Alireza decided to continue his musical activities individually. He released his first official album called "Daghigheham" in 2016. His first concert was held on December 5, 2016, in Milad Hall of Tehran International Fair.

Discography

Albums

Informal 
 Narefigh 1 (2005)
 Narefigh 2 (2007)
 Bi Marefat (2006)
 Ghomar (2008)
 Bi Vafa (2007)
 Shirino Farhad (2005)
 Bi Hoviat (2006)

Official 
 Daghigheham (2016)

Singles 
 2009: Chaharshanbe Suri
 2009: Nato (Ft Hamidreza & Ali As'habi) (sly)
 2010: Ba Man Bemoon (Ft Babak Mafi) (Stay with me)
 2010:  'Emshab' ' (Tonight) 
 2010: Halgheh (The Ring)
 2011: 1%
 2011: Gharar Nabood (Was not supposed)
 2011: Taghvim (Calendar)
 2011: Ruze Nohom (The ninth day)
 2012: Cheghadr Dir (Ft Siavash Kasikhani) (Too late)
 2012: Age Bedooni (You know)
 2012: Vabastegi (Dependency)
 2013: Hame Donyam Toei (You are my whole world)
 2013: Sahel (Beach)
 2013: Dooset Daram (I love you)
 2013: Ruberuye Man (in front of me)
 2014: To Kenare Oon Khoshi (You are happy with him)
 2014: In Zemestoonam Tamoom Shod (This winter also was over)
 2014: Nabashi Pisham (Do not be with me)
 2014: Moohat (Your hair)
 2014: Nemikhamet (I do not want you)
 2015: 175
 2015: Daghigheham (My minutes)
 2015: Yalda
 2016: Siaah (Black)
 2016: Zakhmaye Man (My wounds)
 2016: Azizi (You are dear)
 2016: Delam Pishe Toe (My heart is with you)
 2016: Delgiram (I'm upset)
 2016: Rad Dade Boodi (You refused)
 2016: Be Khodam Bad Kardam (Ft Saeed Atani) (I hurt myself)
 2017: Begoo Na (Say no)
 2017: Ahange Ghamgin (sad song)
 2017: Man Hamoonam (I am the same)
 2017: Nafase Ki Budi To (Who were you breath)
 2017: Deli (From heart)
 2017: Ay Dele Khodam (Oh my heart)
 2017: To Fekr Mikoni Kiee? (Who do you think you are?)
 2018: Miram Peye Kaaram (I'm going to work)
 2018: Ey Dade Bar Man (Oh shout at me)
 2018: Divooneye Doost Dashtani (Lovely crazy)
 2018: Akharesh Ghashange (The end is beautiful)
 2019: Zendegi Joonam (My life)
 2019: Sakhtgir (Strict)
 2019: Bam Nabood Kasi (No one was with me)
 2020: Madar (Mother)
 2020: Ay Dele Ghafel (Oh careless heart)
 2021: Del Be Del  (Heart to Heart)
 2021: Ghaf  (Gh-Persian Alphabet)
 2021: Medly 1 (Remix)
 2022: Khatereh (Memory)
 2022: Leyla
 2022:  Na Nemiaram (No, I won't)
 2022:  Ye Darya Narim (Let's not go to sea)

See also 
 Iranian pop music
 Hamidreza Assar

References

External links 
 

1985 births
Living people
Iranian pianists
Iranian musicians
Iranian composers
Iranian guitarists
People from Tehran
Iranian pop singers
Singers from Tehran
Iranian songwriters
Iranian male singers
Musicians from Tehran
Iranian pop musicians
Iranian music arrangers
Persian-language singers
Iranian singer-songwriters
21st-century Iranian male singers